Pennell Bank is a northeast trending submarine bank on the continental shelf in the Ross Sea. Name approved 2/64 (ACUF 201).

References

Undersea banks of the Southern Ocean